The 2021 BAL group phase began on 16 May 2021 and ended on 24 May 2021. A total of 12 teams competed in the group stage to decide the 8 places in the 2021 BAL Playoffs.

Initially, it was planned that in the regular season, twelve teams play in two Conferences with six teams each. Each team will play five games, one against each opponent, inside its conference. The top three teams from each conference advance to the Super 6. The games will be played in six arenas divided over the African continent. The regular season will start in March 2020.

The format was changed to a group phase as a result of the COVID-19 pandemic. In three groups of four each team plays the other one time and the first, second and best third-placed teams advance to the playoffs.

Group A

Group B

Group C

Ranking of third-placed teams

References

group phase